The Babcock Electric Carriage Company was an early 20th-century United States automobile company, making electric vehicles under the Babcock brand from 1906 through 1912.

The company was founded by and named after Francis A Babcock and based in Buffalo, New York. They offered a range of electric motorcars at prices ranging from $ 1,800 to $3,800.

In 1912 Babcock merged with the Buffalo Electric Vehicle Company.

See also

List of defunct United States automobile manufacturers
History of the electric vehicle

Other Early Electric Vehicles
American Electric 
Argo Electric
Berwick
Binghamton Electric
Buffalo Electric
Century
Columbia Automobile Company
Dayton Electric
Detroit Electric
Grinnell
Menominee
Rauch and Lang 
Riker Electric
Woods Motor Vehicle

References
 Early Electric Car Companies

Electric vehicles introduced in the 20th century
Motor vehicle manufacturers based in New York (state)
Defunct motor vehicle manufacturers of the United States
Brass Era vehicles
Vintage vehicles
Vehicle manufacturing companies established in 1906
1906 establishments in New York (state)
Defunct manufacturing companies based in New York (state)